Zdeněk Kolář and Julian Ocleppo were the defending champions but only Kolář chose to defend his title, partnering Jiří Lehečka.

Kolář successfully defended his title, defeating Lloyd Glasspool and Harri Heliövaara 6–4, 6–4 in the final.

Seeds

Draw

References

External links
 Main draw

Trofeo Faip–Perrel - Doubles
2021 Doubles